Qu Yuan is a 1977 Chinese historical drama film directed by Fong Pau,. The film tells the tragedy of the great Chinese ancient poet Qu Yuan during the Warring States period.

Cast
Tseng Chang as Zhang Yi
Ching Lee as King Huai of Chu
Fong Pau as Qu Yuan
Hee Ching Paw as Chanjuan
Wu Weng as Yu Song

References

External links

1977 films
1970s war films
1970s Mandarin-language films
Films set in the Warring States period
Chinese historical films